Elder High School is a Catholic all-male, college-preparatory high school in the Price Hill neighborhood of Cincinnati, Ohio. The high school has been in existence for over 100 years, and is a diocesan high school within the Archdiocese of Cincinnati.

History
The cornerstone was laid in 1922. Named for William Henry Elder, third bishop and Archbishop of Cincinnati, it was the city's fourth high school and first Catholic diocesan high school. Eventually, 12 other such schools were constructed in the Greater Cincinnati area.

Eleven original parishes of the Western Hills neighborhood were the true founders of the school and served as "feeder parishes" for students. The first graduating class was in 1923, with eight students graduating in the year of the school's opening. Since its founding, over 22,000 students have graduated from the school.

Elder educated girls as well as boys its first five years.

In 1927, Elder's girls' department was transferred to Seton High School next door.  To this day some classes are still mixed.

Academics 
The school's curriculum is accredited by the Ohio Department of Education and the Ohio Catholic School Accrediting Association. Several levels of curriculum are provided. The school has an Honors Program which provides the top students Advanced Placement courses in Art, Calculus, Chemistry, Computer Science, English, World History, U.S. History, American Government, and Physics. In addition, Elder offers other level courses including (in order from most advanced to least) Honors+ (H+), Honors (H), Advanced College Prep (ACP), College Prep 1 (CP1), and College Prep 2 (CP2).

Elder High School was named the Best Private High School in the Greater Cincinnati Area by Cincinnati Magazine.

Athletics

Championship titles 
On June 4, 2005, the Elder varsity baseball team won their record 12th OHSAA Division I State Championship, defeating Toledo Start 3–0. The school has won at least one baseball state championship in every decade since the 1940s, and the baseball team was ranked eighth in the nation in 2005. As of 2006, the Elder baseball program has the most wins (1257-493-4), from 1924 through 2006, and state titles (12) of any school in Ohio.

In addition to baseball, Elder High School has won multiple OHSAA State Championships in several other major sports, including football, basketball, and cross country:

 Baseball – 1943, 1952, 1955, 1956, 1958–1960, 1973, 1978, 1984, 1999, 2005
 Cross country – 1973, 1982, 1986, 1988, 1989
 Basketball – 1973, 1974, 1993
 Football – 2002, 2003

Elder was runner-up in the 2008 State Football Championship held on November 29, 2008 against Cleveland St. Ignatius, losing by a score of 28–20. Elder finished the 2008 season (13–2), with their only other regular season loss coming to Florida power house St. Thomas Aquinas, which was televised on ESPN. St. Thomas Aquinas went on to win the State Florida Championship that year, featuring future NFL stars Giovani Bernard (Cincinnati Bengals) and Brandon Linder (Jacksonville Jaguars). Elder was also runner-up in the 2019 State Football Championship against Pickerington Central, Elder lost 21-14.

Non-OHSAA-sponsored state championships include:

 Volleyball (Ohio High School Boys Volleyball Association) – 1999, 2000, 2008, 2010, 2014, 2016

The Pit
Football games are played at "The Pit". Construction began in the 1930s by students and faculty and was completed in December 1947. The stadium seats 10,000.

Technology 
In November 2004, Elder High School achieved a first of its kind: a varsity high school football game streamed live on the Internet to more than 10,000 viewers across three continents.  In September 2010, Elder High School achieved another first in technology, a varsity high school football game streamed live on the iPhone through EHS Mobile. Elder High School students now also get a laptop to use as part of their tuition.

Notable alumni 

 Academia
 Robert Kaske – professor of medieval literature at Cornell University
 Athletics
 Buzz Boyle – MLB player (Boston Braves, Brooklyn Dodgers)
 Ralph Brickner – MLB player (Boston Red Sox)
 Robert Hoernschemeyer (1943) – professional football running back
 Jim Brosnan (1945) – pitcher for the Chicago Cubs, St. Louis Cardinals, Cincinnati Reds and Chicago White Sox
 Bob Fry (1949) – professional football offensive lineman
 Gordon Massa (1953) – catcher for the Chicago Cubs, 1957–1958
 Ron Moeller – MLB player (Baltimore Orioles, Los Angeles Angels, Washington Senators)
 Steve Junker (1953) – professional football tight end for 1957 NFL champion Detroit Lions
 Dan James (1955) – professional football player
 Pat Kelsey – head coach of the Division I College of Charleston basketball team
 Joe Schaffer (1955) – professional football player for the Buffalo Bills, 1960
 Steve Tensi (1961) – professional football quarterback
 Bill Earley (1974) – pitcher for the St. Louis Cardinals, 1986
 Chris Nichting (1984) – Major League Baseball pitcher
 Dan Rohrmeier – MLB player (Seattle Mariners)
 Ricky Brown (2002) – professional football player for the Oakland Raiders
 Eric Wood (2004) – 28th pick in the 2009 NFL Draft and former professional football player for the Buffalo Bills
 Mike Windt (2004) – Former professional football player for the San Diego Chargers
 Jake McQuaide (2006) – professional football player for the Dallas Cowboys
 Kyle Rudolph (2008) – All-American college football tight end, Notre Dame; professional football player previously for the Minnesota Vikings and currently for the Tampa Bay Buccaneers
 Tommy Kraemer (2016)  - NFL offensive guard for the Detroit Lions
 Steve Keller – professional soccer player for the Dallas Burn

 Clergy
 John J. Kaising – Auxiliary Bishop of the Archdiocese for the Military Services, USA

 Business
 George Schaefer Jr. – former CEO of Fifth Third Bancorp

 Government and politics
 Donald D. Clancy – eight-term Republican member of the United States House of Representatives (January 3, 1961 – January 3, 1977)
 Steve Driehaus (1984) – former Democratic member of the U.S. House of Representatives, 1st district
 Henry Jude (Trey) Radel III (1994)  former Republican member of the U.S. House of Representatives

 Media/Entertainment
 Jim Borgman – Pulitzer Prize–winning cartoonist for The Cincinnati Enquirer
 Bill Hemmer (1983) – Fox News Channel journalist and anchor, formerly with CNN
 John Riggi – Emmy Award-nominated comedy writer for 30 Rock.

References

External links
 
EHSports.com – Elder sports teams

Roman Catholic Archdiocese of Cincinnati
Private schools in Cincinnati
Educational institutions established in 1922
Catholic secondary schools in Ohio
Boys' schools in Ohio
High schools in Hamilton County, Ohio
1922 establishments in Ohio